Lipovka is a rural locality (a selo) in Kozmodemyanovsky Selsoviet of Tambovsky District, Amur Oblast, Russia. The population was 131 as of 2018. There is 1 street.

Geography 
Lipovka is located 18 km northeast of Tambovka (the district's administrative centre) by road. Chuyevka is the nearest rural locality.

References 

Rural localities in Tambovsky District, Amur Oblast